Marger "Migs" Apsit (June 5, 1909 – December 22, 1988) was an American football running back in the National Football League (NFL) for the Brooklyn Dodgers, the Frankford Yellow Jackets, the Green Bay Packers, and the Boston Redskins.  He played college football at the University of Southern California.

Early life
Apsit was born in Aurora, Illinois to Latvian immigrants in 1909.  He attended West Aurora High School, where he played football from 1924 to 1926 as a fullback and defensive back.

College career
Apsit attended and played college football at the University of Southern California under coach Howard Jones.  While playing at USC, the Trojans compiled a record of 27–4–1, won the 1928 national championship, and defeated the undefeated Pittsburgh Panthers in the 1930 Rose Bowl.

Professional career
After graduating from USC, Apsit played football professionally in the NFL for the Brooklyn Dodgers, the Frankford Yellow Jackets, the Green Bay Packers, and the Boston Redskins.

Coaching career
After retiring from professional football, Apsit returned to Aurora to become head coach at his alma mater in 1935.  In 1936, he led the West Aurora Blackbawks to an undefeated 9–0–0 record and conference championship.  After coaching at West Aurora for eight seasons, he moved to California in 1942 and became the head coach at Glendale College from 1946 to 1949.  He then became the head coach at East Bakersfield High School in Bakersfield, California, a position he would hold for over twenty years.  While at East Bakersfield, Apsit was also the athletic director and golf coach.

References

External links
 
 

1909 births
1988 deaths
Sportspeople from Aurora, Illinois
Players of American football from Illinois
American football running backs
USC Trojans football players
Brooklyn Dodgers (NFL) players
Frankford Yellow Jackets players
Green Bay Packers players
Boston Redskins players
Glendale Vaqueros football coaches
American people of Latvian descent